"Rauisuchia" is a paraphyletic group of mostly large and carnivorous Triassic archosaurs. Rauisuchians are a category of archosaurs within a larger group called Pseudosuchia, which encompasses all archosaurs more closely related to crocodilians than to birds and other dinosaurs. First named in the 1940s, Rauisuchia was a name exclusive to Triassic archosaurs which were generally large (often ), carnivorous, and quadrupedal with a pillar-erect hip posture, though exceptions exist for all of these traits. Rauisuchians, as a traditional taxonomic group, were considered distinct from other Triassic archosaur groups such as early dinosaurs, phytosaurs (crocodile-like carnivores), aetosaurs (armored herbivores), and crocodylomorphs (lightly-built crocodilian ancestors).

However, more recent studies on archosaur evolution have upended this idea based on phylogenetic analyses and cladistics, a modern approach to taxonomy based on clades (nested monophyletic groups of common ancestry). Since the early 2010s, archosaur classification schemes have stabilized on a system where Rauisuchia is rendered an evolutionary grade, or even a wastebin taxon. Crocodylomorphs most likely originated from a rauisuchian ancestor based on a myriad of shared traits, and some "rauisuchians" (such as Postosuchus and Rauisuchus) appear to be more closely related to crocodylomorphs than to other "rauisuchians" (such as Prestosuchus and Saurosuchus).

As a result, Rauisuchia in its traditional usage is may be considered paraphyletic: a group which is defined by shared ancestry but also excludes a descendant taxon (in this case, crocodylomorphs). To designate it as an informal group in scientific literature, the name is often enclosed in quotation marks. Several monophyletic groups have been erected to classify "rauisuchians" in a cladistic framework. The closest concept is the clade Paracrocodylomorpha, which includes most "rauisuchian" taxa and their crocodylomorph descendants. Paracrocodylomorpha is divided into two branches: Poposauroidea, which includes a variety of strange "rauisuchians" (some of which were bipedal and/or herbivorous) and Loricata, which includes most typical "rauisuchians" and crocodylomorphs.

Characteristics 

"Rauisuchians" had an erect gait with their legs oriented vertically beneath the body rather than sprawling outward. This type of gait is also seen in dinosaurs, but evolved independently in the two groups. In dinosaurs, the hip socket faces outward and the femur (thigh bone) connects to the side of the hip; while in rauisuchians, the hip socket faces downward to form a shelf of bone under which the femur connects. This has been referred to as the pillar-erect posture.

"Rauisuchians" lived throughout most of the Triassic. Along with many other large archosaurs, the group died out in the Triassic-Jurassic extinction event (barring crocodylomorphs, which survive to the present in the form of crocodilians). After their extinction, theropod dinosaurs were able to emerge as the sole large terrestrial predators, though there is still some debate over how the extinction influenced dinosaur evolution. The footprints of meat-eating dinosaurs may have suddenly increased in size at the start of the Jurassic, when rauisuchians were absent. However, the apparent increase in dinosaur footprint size has instead been argued to be a result of increasing abundance of large theropods, rather than an abrupt acquisition of large size. Some "rauisuchians" may have existed in the very early Jurassic based on bone fragments from South Africa, but this identification is tentative.

The name "Rauisuchia" comes from the genus Rauisuchus, which was named after fossil collector Dr. Wilhelm Rau. The name Rauisuchus means Wilhelm Rau's crocodile.

History of classification 
"Rauisuchians" were originally thought to be related to erythrosuchids, but it is now known that they are pseudosuchians. Three families have historically been recognised: Prestosuchidae, Rauisuchidae, and Poposauridae, as well as a number of forms (e.g. those from the Olenekian of Russia) that are too primitive and/or poorly known to fit in any of these groups.

There has been considerable suggestion that the group as currently defined is paraphyletic, representing a number of related lineages independently evolving and filling the same ecological niche of medium to top terrestrial predator. For example, Parrish (1993) and Juul (1994) considered poposaurid rauisuchians to be more closely related to Crocodilia than to prestosuchids. Nesbitt (2003) presented a different phylogeny with a monophyletic Rauisuchia. The group may even be something of a "wastebasket taxon". Determining exact phylogenetic relationships is difficult because of the scrappy nature of a lot of the material. However, further discoveries and studies, such as a study on the braincase of Batrachotomus (2002) and restudies of other forms, such as Erpetosuchus (2002) have shed some light on the evolutionary relationships of this poorly known group.

Cladistics
Despite its inclusion as an informal grouping in numerous phylogenetic studies, "Rauisuchia" has never received a formal definition. Most analyses in the past decade have found "Rauisuchia" to be a paraphyletic grouping, including all studies with a large sample size. Those that found the possibility that it was a natural group produced only weak support for this hypothesis. In his large 2011 analysis of archosaurian relationships, Nesbitt recommended that the term "Rauisuchia" be abandoned.

In a study of the ctenosauriscid Arizonasaurus, paleontologist Sterling Nesbitt defined a clade of rauisuchians called "Group X". This group includes Arizonasuchus, Lotosaurus, Sillosuchus, Shuvosaurus, and Effigia. One distinguishing feature of Group X is their lack of osteoderms, which are common among many other crurotarsans. Many more features are found in the pelvis, including fully fused sacral vertebrae and a long, thin crest on the ilium called the supra-acetabular crest. Additionally, many members of Group X have smooth frontal and nasal bones, which make up the upper portion of the rostrum. In other "rauisuchians" and many other crurotarsans, this area has bumps and ridges. "Group X" is now termed Poposauroidea.

Nesbitt later erected another clade, "Group Y", in 2007. Group Y falls within Group X to include Sillosuchus, Shuvosaurus, and Effigia. Group Y is diagnosed by the presence of four or more sacral vertebrae with fully fused neural arches, which is also seen in theropod dinosaurs (a case of evolutionary convergence). In addition, the cervical vertebrae that make up the neck are strongly amphicoelus, meaning that they are concave at both ends. The fourth trochanter, a ridge of bone on the femur for muscle attachment seen in nearly all archosaurs, is absent in Group Y. "Group Y" is now termed Shuvosauridae.

Although not placed within Group Y, Lotosaurus shares many similarities with members of the clade, foremost of which is edentulous, or toothless, jaws. Edentulism is also seen in Shuvosaurus and Effigia, which have beak-like jaws. Nesbitt suggested that the derived characters of Lotosaurus may indicate that it is a transitional form between basal members of Group X and members of Group Y.

Below is the cladogram from Nesbitt (2007):

In their phylogenetic study of archosaurs, Brusatte et al. (2010) found only weak support for Rauisuchia as a monophyletic grouping. As a result of their analysis, two clades were found to be within Rauisuchia, which they named Rauisuchoidea and Poposauroidea. Rauisuchoidea included Rauisuchidae and Prestosuchidae, as well as several basal taxa that were once assigned to the families, including Fasolasuchus and Ticinosuchus. Poposauroidea included poposaurids and ctenosauriscids, but the phylogeny had a large polytomy of genera in both groups that was difficult to resolve, which included Arizonasaurus, Poposaurus, and Sillosuchus. However, the characters linking these two groups were weak, and the question as to whether or not "Rauisuchia" forms a natural group remains unresolved. Brusatte et al. (2010) was one of the last studies to find a monophyletic Rauisuchia clade.

Below is the cladogram from Brusatte et al. (2010):

In a more thorough test of archosaurian relationships published in 2011 by Sterling Nesbitt, "rauisuchians" were found to be paraphyletic, with Poposauroidea at the base of the clade Paracrocodylomorpha, and the rest of the "rauisuchians" forming a grade within the clade Loricata. Nesbitt noted that no previous study of "rauisuchian" relationships had ever included a wide variety of supposed "rauisuchians" as well as a large number of non-"rauisuchian" taxa as controls.

Fossil record
Well-known "rauisuchians" include Ticinosuchus of the Middle Triassic of Switzerland and Northern Italy, Saurosuchus of the Late Triassic (late Carnian) of Argentina, Prestosuchus of the Middle-Late Triassic (late Ladinian-early Carnian) of Brazil, and Postosuchus of the Late Triassic (Norian) of the southwest United States. The first "rauisuchian" known to paleontology was Teratosaurus, a German genus from the Late Triassic (Norian) of Germany. However, Teratosaurus was considered an early theropod dinosaur for much of its history, before it was demonstrated to be non-dinosaurian in the 1980s. The concept of "rauisuchians" as a distinct group of reptiles distantly related to crocodiles was recognized by discoveries in Brazil in the 1940s (particularly Prestosuchus and Rauisuchus) and emphasized further by the description of Ticinosuchus in the 1960s.

The oldest known "rauisuchians", in terms of geological age, are probably from the end of the Early Triassic (late Olenekian). Most of these early fossils are fragmentary and dubious remains from Russia, but some are better-described and constrained, such as Xilousuchus, a ctenosauriscid from the Heshanggou Formation of China. Xilousuchus is neither the earliest-branching archosaur nor "rauisuchian" despite its early age, and its presence in the Early Triassic suggests that other archosaur fossils are simply undiscovered from that time. The last known "rauisuchians", excluding their descendants the crocodylomorphs, are from the latter part of the Late Triassic. The shuvosaurid Effigia, from the "siltstone member" of the Chinle Formation in New Mexico, may be as young as the Rhaetian, the last stage of the Triassic. Effigia was recovered from the Coelophysis Quarry of Ghost Ranch. The same site also preserves a large undescribed archosaur, CM 73372, which seemingly represents a transitional form between "rauisuchians" and crocodylomorphs. Indeterminate large paracrocodylomorph material from the Lower Elliot Formation of South Africa may be even younger, late Rhaetian or possibly even lowermost Jurassic.

List of rauisuchian genera 
The following is a list of valid pseudosuchian genera which have been informally or formally classified as rauisuchians, as well as their modern cladistic interpretation. This list does not include genera named for dubious and poorly-diagnosed "rauisuchian" material from Russia (Dongusia, Energosuchus, Jaikosuchus, Jushatyria, Scythosuchus, Tsylmosuchus, Vjushkovisaurus, Vytshegdosuchus) and China (Fenhosuchus, Wangisuchus), nor taxa reclassified as non-"rauisuchian" archosaurs (Ornithosuchus, Gracilisuchus, Dongusuchus, Yarasuchus).

Notes

References 

 
 
 

Pseudosuchians
Taxa named by Friedrich von Huene
Fossil taxa described in 1942
Paraphyletic groups